Maedeli la brèche is a 1980 Belgian short film written and directed by Jaco Van Dormael. The short film was shot in 1980 in Belgium with a Super 35 camera. The film starred Nico d'Oreye, Julie Dubart, Colette Forton, Marie-José Mgank and Jean-François Dufranne. The original music score was written by Pierre Van Dormael, Jaco's brother. Van Dormael wrote the film while he was a student at the INSAS in Brussels.

Response
On June 7, 1981, Maedeli la brèche won the Honorary Foreign Film Award at the 8th Student Academy Awards presented by the Academy of Motion Picture Arts and Sciences. It was awarded the Best Screenplay and the Best Short Film at the 1981 Festival de Bruxelles. It also received the Channel 4 Award at the 1983 Munich Film Festival. In 2011, it appeared at the Sottodiciotto Filmfestival held in Turin in the retrospective dedicated to Van Dormael.

References

External links

1980 films
1980 short films
Belgian short films
1980s Swedish-language films
1980s French-language films
Films directed by Jaco Van Dormael
1980 multilingual films
Belgian multilingual films